Prunus campanulata is a species of cherry native to Japan, Taiwan, southern and eastern China (Guangxi, Guangdong, Hainan, Hunan, Fujian, and Zhejiang), and Vietnam. It is widely grown as an ornamental tree, and a symbol of Nago in the Ryukyu Islands of Japan. It is variously known in English as the Taiwan cherry, Formosan cherry, or bellflower cherry. It was described in 1883 by Carl Johann Maximowicz.

Invasive species
The tree is an invasive plant species in the Northland Region of New Zealand. It is illegal to distribute, sell or propagate the plant or to distribute soil, gravel, etc., that contain the seeds or other parts of the plant.

Ecological interactions
Prunus campanulata is the host of larval Chrysozephyrus nishikaze, a butterfly species endemic to Taiwan. Flowers and nectar of Prunus campanulata are among the main food sources of Taiwan yuhinas during their breeding season.

Reproduction
Prunus campanulata is one of the many cherry blossom trees that blooms early. Their seeds portray a physiological and morphological dormancy that is broken when exposed to cold and warm temperatures before germination. The flower is fertilized by pollinating insects and can begin to flower in 1 to 2 years.

Images

References

External links

 

www.iucngisd.org/gisd/species.php?sc=1666.
“Taiwan Cherry.” Taiwan Cherry - University of Florida, Institute of Food and Agricultural Sciences, 31 July 2019, gardeningsolutions.ifas.ufl.edu/plants/trees-and-shrubs/trees/taiwan-cherry.html.

campanulata
Cherry blossom
Plants described in 1883
Flora of Eastern Asia
Trees of China
Trees of Vietnam